Steve Brown (born March 31, 1965) is a Canadian former professional ice hockey and roller hockey player.

Brown played professional roller hockey with the Vancouver Voodoo of Roller Hockey International during the 1995 season.

References

1965 births
Basingstoke Bison players
British Hockey League players
Canadian ice hockey defencemen
Fife Flyers players
Hull Thunder players
Living people
Vancouver VooDoo players
Whitley Warriors players
Canadian expatriate ice hockey players in England
Canadian expatriate ice hockey players in Scotland
Canadian expatriate ice hockey players in Germany